The House at 1011 S. Madison Ave. is a historic house located at 1011 South Madison Avenue in Pasadena, California. Architect Sylvanus B. Marston of Marston, Van Pelt & Maybury designed the Prairie School style house, which was built in 1911. The two-story house has a square box plan inspired by a 1907 Frank Lloyd Wright design called "A Fireproof House for $50,000". The house has a horizontal emphasis characteristic of the Prairie School and a low hipped roof. A side porch is located on the north side of the house, which originally also had a front porch that has since been enclosed. Rows of casement windows on the front of each story feature a decorative pattern with three vertical panes and a transom.

The house was added to the National Register of Historic Places on August 6, 1998.

References

Houses on the National Register of Historic Places in California
Prairie School architecture in California
Houses completed in 1911
Buildings and structures on the National Register of Historic Places in Pasadena, California
Houses in Pasadena, California